Thomas Reifeltshammer (born 3 July 1988) is an Austrian former professional association football player. He played as a defender. Reifeltshammer made his professional debut on 27 November 2009, coming on as a substitute in the 0–0 draw with SV Mattersburg.

External links

1988 births
Living people
Austrian footballers
Association football defenders
Austrian Football Bundesliga players
SV Ried players